The 24H Series is a sports car racing and touring car racing series developed by Creventic and with approval from the Fédération Internationale de l'Automobile (FIA).  It features GT3-spec cars, GT4-spec cars, sports cars, touring cars and 24H-Specials, like silhouette cars. The calendar consists only of 24-hour and 12-hour races. 2015 was the first season with drivers battling for championship points and titles. It also marked the first season with official FIA International Series’ status.

Creventic
Dutch agency Creventic is the organiser and promoter of the series. Their goals are to organise races with "low costs, a convivial atmosphere with teams and drivers from all over the world and fair competition on the track." In co-operation with the Dutch National Racing Team (DNRT) – one of the biggest motorsport organisations of the Benelux – they organised the inaugural Dubai 24 Hour in 2006.
2008 was the first year Creventic organised another race besides the 24H Dubai: the 12H Hungary, making it the first season with more than one race and the official first season of the 24H Series. 2015 marked the first season with official FIA International Series’ status, which meant that drivers and teams would be eligible to battle for championship titles and points. Creventic is also the organiser of the 24H TCE Series.

Circuits

  Algarve International Circuit (2017–2020, 2022)
  Autodromo di Pergusa (2020)
  Brno Circuit (2015–2016, 2019)
  Circuit de Barcelona-Catalunya (2011–2016, 2018–2019, 2021–present)
  Circuit de Spa-Francorchamps (2018–2019, 2022–present)
  Circuit of the Americas (2017–2019)
  Circuit Paul Ricard (2015–2017, 2021)
  Circuit Zandvoort (2014–2016)
  Circuito de Navarra (2018)
  Circuito do Estoril (2023)
  Dubai Autodrome (2006–present)
  Hockenheimring (2020–2022)
  Hungaroring (2008–2011, 2013–2014, 2021)
  Imola Circuit (2017–2018)
  Kuwait Motor Town (2022–present)
  Monza Circuit (2020, 2023)
  Mount Panorama Circuit (2013)
  Mugello Circuit (2014–2017, 2019–present)
  Red Bull Ring (2017)
  Sebring International Raceway (2021)
  Silverstone Circuit (2016, 2018)
  Yas Marina Circuit (2023)

Winners (2006–2014)
Winners of races organised by Creventic before official FIA status are:

Official FIA seasons
 2015 24H Series
 2016 24H Series
 2017 24H Series
 2018 24H GT Series
 2019 24H GT Series
 2020 24H GT Series
 2021 24H GT Series
 2022 24H GT Series
 2023 24H GT Series

Champions

Drivers (2015–2016)

Teams (2015–2017)

See also
 Touring Car Endurance Series
 Dubai 24 Hour

Notes

References

External links 

 
Sports car racing series
Touring car racing series
Group GT3
GT4 (sports car class)
Endurance motor racing